The British Empire Medal (BEM; formerly British Empire Medal for Meritorious Service) is a British and Commonwealth award for meritorious civil or military service worthy of recognition by the Crown. The current honour was created in 1922 to replace the original medal, which had been established in 1917 as part of the Order of the British Empire.

Award
The British Empire Medal is granted in recognition of meritorious civil or military service. Recipients are entitled to use the post-nominal letters "BEM".

Since December 1918, the honour has been divided into civil and military divisions in a similar way to the Order of the British Empire itself. While recipients are not members of the Order, the medal is affiliated to it.

Between 1993 and 2012, the British Empire Medal was not awarded to subjects of the United Kingdom, although it continued to be awarded in some Commonwealth realms during that time. The practice of awarding the Medal to British subjects was resumed in June 2012, to coincide with the Queen's Diamond Jubilee, but only in the civil division.

Since March 1941 a clasp attached to the ribbon can be bestowed to denote a further award.

A holder of the BEM subsequently appointed to membership of the Order of the British Empire is permitted to wear the insignia for both.

History

1917–1922
The Medal of the Order of the British Empire was established in June 1917, along with the Order of the British Empire of which it was a part, and could be awarded for either meritorious service or for gallantry. It was awarded to 2,014 people, 800 of whom were from foreign countries.

1922–1940
In 1922, the original medal was discontinued, and was replaced by two separate honours, both of which still formed part of the Order of the British Empire. These two honours were known as the Medal of the Order of the British Empire for Meritorious Service (usually referred to as British Empire Medal, BEM) and the Medal of the Order of the British Empire for Gallantry (usually referred to as Empire Gallantry Medal, EGM). Of these medals, the EGM was awarded for acts of bravery, until it was replaced by the George Cross in 1940. The BEM was awarded in similar circumstances as the lower classes of the Order of the British Empire, but usually to people below management or professional level. In the uniformed services, it was awarded to non-commissioned officers of the armed forces, officers below superintendent rank in the police, and personnel below divisional officer level in the fire services.

1940–1992

On 24 September 1940, the George Cross was established, and the EGM was revoked by Royal Warrant the same day. All living recipients, other than honorary recipients, and the next-of-kin of those posthumously awarded the EGM after 3 September 1939, the start of the Second World War, were to exchange their insignia for the George Cross. Recipients of the BEM were not affected by these changes.

From 1940, the war led to an increasing number of BEMs awarded to service personnel and civilians, including the merchant marine, police and civil defence, for acts of gallantry that did not reach the standard of the George Medal (GM). Such awards often had citations, while awards for meritorious service usually did not.

From 14 January 1958, awards of the BEM for acts of gallantry were formally designated the British Empire Medal for Gallantry and consisted of the BEM with a silver oak leaf emblem worn on the ribbon. The first recipients of this newly designated award were two Board of Customs officers, George Elrick Thomson and John Rees Thomas, who ventured into a burning steamship hold in an attempt to rescue a colleague. Like the GM, the BEM for Gallantry could not be awarded posthumously and was eventually replaced in 1974 with the Queen's Gallantry Medal (QGM). Again, recipients of the BEM for services other than acts of bravery were not affected by these changes.

1992–2012
The BEM continued to be awarded to subjects of the United Kingdom until 1992. After a 1993 review of the British honours system, the government decided that the distinction between the BEM and MBE had "become increasingly tenuous" and the Prime Minister, John Major, ended the award of the BEM to British subjects, although the medal continued to be awarded in some Commonwealth countries, such as the Bahamas and the Cook Islands.

From 2012
Following the 2011 Commonwealth Heads of Government Meeting, Prime Minister David Cameron announced that the BEM would once again be awarded in the United Kingdom, although only in the civil division; this would start beginning in 2012, to coincide with the Queen's Diamond Jubilee. In the 2012 Birthday Honours, released on 16 June 2012, the BEM was awarded to 293 people.

Although those awarded the honour do not receive it from the monarch in person, but from the Lord Lieutenant of their county, recipients are invited to a Buckingham Palace garden party to celebrate their achievement.

Appearance
The Medal of the Order of the British Empire awarded from 1917 to 1922 was a circular silver medal,  in diameter, showing a seated Britannia and the inscription FOR GOD AND THE EMPIRE on the obverse and the Royal cypher on the reverse. The medal was awarded unnamed.

This was plain purple, with a red central stripe for the military division, until 1937 when, like the Order, the ribbon changed to the current design of rose-pink with pearl-grey edges, with an additional pearl-grey central stripe for the military division. The medal was presented with the recipient's name on the rim.

References

External links

Search recommendations for the British Empire Medal on The UK National Archives' website.
 British Empire Medal on the Veterans Affairs Canada site 

Civil awards and decorations of the United Kingdom
Decorations of the Merchant Navy
Military awards and decorations of the United Kingdom